Sarah M'Barek (born 13 October 1977) is a French football manager and former player. She played as a midfielder and has represented the France women's national team, having attained 21 caps.

Club career
M'Barek starred for Montpellier from 2001 to 2005.

Managerial career
M'Barek was manager of Guingamp in the Division 1 Féminine from 2013, but left to become manager of Racing Club de Lens Féminin that competes in Division 2 Féminine.

Personal life
M'Barek is of Tunisian descent.

References

External links 
 
 

1977 births
Living people
People from Chaumont, Haute-Marne
Sportspeople from Haute-Marne
French women's footballers
Women's association football midfielders
Montpellier HSC (women) players
Division 1 Féminine players
France women's international footballers
French football managers
Female association football managers
Women's association football managers
French sportspeople of Tunisian descent
Footballers from Grand Est